"The World Tonight" is a song by Paul McCartney and is the second track on his 1997 album Flaming Pie.

In the United States, the song was released as the first and only single from the album on 17 April 1997, peaking at number 64 on the Billboard Hot 100 and number 23 on the Billboard Modern Rock Tracks chart. The B-side for the American release was originally released in the UK as the B-side for "Young Boy" single and is an additional collaboration with Ringo Starr.

In the UK the song was released as the second single from Flaming Pie in July, peaking at #23 in the UK Singles Chart (see 1997 in British music). The B-sides for the British release are two songs from Flaming Pie: "Used to Be Bad" and "Really Love You".

Track listings
All songs written by Paul McCartney, except where noted.

US CD C2 7243 8 58650 2 2, released 6 May 1997 by Capitol Records.
"The World Tonight" – 4:03
"Looking for You" – 4:48
"Oobu Joobu" (Part 1) – 9:55
UK 7" RP6472, UK CD1 CDRS6472
"The World Tonight" – 4:03
"Used to Be Bad" (Steve Miller, McCartney) – 4:08
"Oobu Joobu" (Part 3) – 9:48 CD only
UK CD2 CDR6472
"The World Tonight" – 4:03
"Really Love You" (McCartney, Richard Starkey) – 5:14
"Oobu Joobu" (Part 4) – 7:06

Oobu Joobu information
The "Oobu Joobu" songs are a series of demos, interviews, and unreleased songs jumbled together into one track.   The name is taken from McCartney's radio program.

"Oobu Joobu" (part 3) contains:
Intro chat – 0:09
"Oobu Joobu Main Theme" – 0:48
"Squid" – 6:25
Paul talks about "The World Tonight" – 1:23
Link – 0:05
"Oobu Joobu Main Theme" – 0:59

"Oobu Joobu" (part 4) contains:
Intro chat – 0:06
"Oobu Joobu Main Theme" – 0:37
Link – 0:18
"Don't Break the Promise" – 3:39
Paul talks about reggae – 1:25
Link – 0:04
"Oobu Joobu Main Theme" – 0:57

Charts

Weekly charts

Year-end charts

Personnel
Paul McCartney - lead and harmony vocals, bass guitar, acoustic and electric guitars, piano, drums, percussion
Jeff Lynne - harmony vocals, electric guitar, acoustic guitar, keyboards

Notes

External links
Paul McCartney - The World Tonight at Graham Calkin's Beatles Pages.

Paul McCartney songs
1997 singles
Song recordings produced by Jeff Lynne
Songs written by Paul McCartney
Parlophone singles
Song recordings produced by Paul McCartney
Music published by MPL Music Publishing
1995 songs